The Trinidad and Tobago Charity Shield is the country's annual football match contested between the champions of the previous TT Pro League season and the holders of the Pro Bowl. If the Pro League champions also won the Pro Bowl, then the league runners-up provide the opposition. Often seen as a "glorified friendly", which ranks below the FA Trophy and First Citizens Cup, the fixture is a recognised football Super Cup. The match is sponsored by Digicel and is therefore officially known as the Digicel Charity Shield.

Organised by the TT Pro League, part of the proceeds from the game go towards introducing the "Read to Rise" Primary Literacy Program to a school within the winning team's community. In addition, the winning side also receives TT$10,000 to be donated to a charitable cause of choice. The inaugural charitable cash prize was given to former captain and player Jan-Michael Williams of W Connection to offset medical expenses for his fiancée Candice Worrell. Worrell was brutally assaulted while being relieved of her mobile phone in January 2012 and was comatose for nearly three months.

History
The fixture was first played to open the 2012–13 season and was contested between W Connection, who were the 2011–12 champions of the TT Pro League, and Defence Force, who were the winners of the 2012 Digicel Pro Bowl. The inaugural match ended with the Savonetta Boys holding the Charity Shield after a 2–0 win over Defence Force on 8 September 2012 at Manny Ramjohn Stadium in Marabella. In 2013, the Savonetta Boys secured the Charity Shield for the second consecutive year after defeating the Teteron Boys 4–2 at the Hasely Crawford Stadium in a rematch of the previous year's Charity Shield.
They won the title for the third year in a row in 2014.

Matches

Results by team

References

External links 
 Official Website

 
Charity Shield
Charity Shield
Recurring sporting events established in 2012
2012 establishments in Trinidad and Tobago
Trinidad and Tobago